Tsitsi Dangarembga (born 4 February 1959) is a Zimbabwean novelist, playwright and filmmaker. Her debut novel, Nervous Conditions (1988), which was the first to be published in English by a Black woman from Zimbabwe, was named by the BBC in 2018 as one of the top 100 books that have shaped the world. She has won other literary honors. In 2022 she was convicted in a Zimbabwe court of inciting public violence, by displaying, on a public road, a placard asking for reform.

In 2020, her novel This Mournable Body was shortlisted for the Booker Prize.

Early life and education 

Dangarembga was born on 4 February 1959 in Mutoko, Southern Rhodesia (now Zimbabwe), a small town where her parents taught at the nearby mission school. Her mother, Susan Dangarembga, was the first black woman in Southern Rhodesia to obtain a bachelor's degree, and her father, Amon, would later become a school headmaster. Dangarembga lived in England from ages of two to six while her parents pursued higher education. There, she recalled that she and her brother began to speak English "as a matter of course and forgot most of the Shona we had learnt." She returned to Rhodesia with her family in 1965, the year of the colony's Unilateral Declaration of Independence. In Rhodesia, she reacquired Shona, but considered English, the language of her schooling, her first language.

In 1965, she moved with her family to Old Mutare, a Methodist mission near Umtali (now Mutare) where her father and mother took up respective positions as headmaster and teacher at Hartzell High School. Dangarembga, who had begun her education in England, enrolled at Hartzell Primary School, before going to board at the Marymount Mission convent school. She completed her A-Levels at Arundel School, an elite, predominantly white girls' school in the capital, Salisbury (today Harare), and in 1977 went to the University of Cambridge to study medicine at Sidney Sussex College. There, she experienced racism and isolation and left after three years, returning in 1980 to Zimbabwe several months before the country's independence.

Dangarembga worked briefly as a teacher, before taking up studies in medicine and psychology at the University of Zimbabwe while working for two years as a copywriter at a marketing agency. She joined the university drama club, and wrote and directed several of the plays the group performed. She also became involved with the theatre group Zambuko, during which she participated in the production of two plays, Katshaa! and Mavambo. She later recalled, "There were simply no plays with roles for black women, or at least we didn't have access to them at the time. The writers in Zimbabwe were basically men at the time. And so I really didn't see that the situation would be remedied unless some women sat down and wrote something, so that's what I did!" She wrote three plays during this period: Lost of the Soil (1983), She No Longer Weeps, and The Third One. During these years, she also began reading works by African-American women writers and contemporary African literature, a shift from the English classics she had grown up reading.

Career

1980s and 1990s
In 1985, Dangarembga's short story "The Letter" won second place in a writing competition arranged by the Swedish International Development Cooperation Agency, and was published in Sweden in the anthology Whispering Land. In 1987, her play She No Longer Weeps, which she wrote during her university years, was published in Harare. Her first novel, Nervous Conditions, was published in 1988 in the United Kingdom, and a year later in the United States. She wrote it in 1985, but experienced difficulties getting it published; rejected by four Zimbabwean publishers, she eventually found a willing publisher in the London-based Women's Press. Nervous Conditions, the first novel written in English by a black woman from Zimbabwe, received domestic and international acclaim, and was awarded the Commonwealth Writers' Prize (Africa region) in 1989. Her work is included in the 1992 anthology Daughters of Africa, edited by Margaret Busby. Nervous Conditions is considered one of the best African novels ever written, and was included on the BBC's 2018 list of top 100 books that have shaped the world.

In 1989, Dangarembga went to Germany to study film direction at the German Film and Television Academy Berlin. She produced a number of films while in Berlin, including a documentary aired on German television. In 1992, she founded Nyerai Films, a production company based in Harare. She wrote the story for the film Neria, made in 1991, which became the highest-grossing film in Zimbabwean history.  Her 1996 film Everyone's Child, the first feature film directed by a black Zimbabwean woman, was shown internationally, including at the Dublin International Film Festival. The film, shot on location in Harare and Domboshava, follows the tragic stories of four siblings after their parents die of AIDS.

2000 onwards
In 2000, Dangarembga moved back to Zimbabwe with her family, and continued her work with Nyerai Films. In 2002, she founded the International Images Film Festival. Her 2005 film Kare Kare Zvako won the Short Film Award and Golden Dhow at the Zanzibar International Film Festival, and the African Short Film Award at the Milan Film Festival. Her 2006 film Peretera Maneta received the UNESCO Children's and Human Rights Award and won the Zanzibar International Film Festival. She is the executive director of the organization Women Filmmakers of Zimbabwe and the founding director of the Women's Film Festival of Harare. As of 2010, she has also served on the board of the Zimbabwe College of Music for five years, including two years as chair. She is a founding member of the Institute for Creative Arts for Progress for Creative Arts in Africa (ICAPA).

Asked about her lack of writing since Nervous Conditions, Dangarembga explained in 2004: "firstly, the novel was published only after I had turned to film as a medium; secondly, Virginia Woolf's shrewd observation that a woman needs £500 and a room of her own in order to write is entirely valid. Incidentally, I am moving and hope that, for the first time since Nervous Conditions, I shall have a room of my own. I'll try to ignore the bit about £500." Indeed, two years later in 2006, she published her second novel, The Book of Not, a sequel to Nervous Conditions. She also became involved in politics, and in 2010 was named education secretary of the Movement for Democratic Change political party led by Arthur Mutambara. She cited her background coming from a family of educators, her brief stint as a teacher, and her "practical, if not formal," involvement in the education sector as preparing her for the role. She completed doctoral studies in African studies at Humboldt University of Berlin, and wrote her PhD thesis on the reception of African film.

She was a judge for the 2014 Etisalat Prize for Literature. In 2016, she was selected by the Rockefeller Foundation Bellagio Center for their Artists in Residency program. Her third novel, This Mournable Body, a sequel to The Book of Not and Nervous Conditions, was published in 2018 by Graywolf Press in the US, and in the UK by Faber and Faber in 2020, described by Alexandra Fuller in The New York Times as "another masterpiece" and by Novuyo Rosa Tshuma in The Guardian as "magnificent ... another classic" This Mournable Body was one of the six novels shortlisted for the 2020 Booker Prize, chosen from 162 submissions.

In 2019, Dangarembga was announced as a finalist for the St. Francis College Literary Prize, a biennial award recognizing outstanding fiction by writers in the middle stages of their careers.

She was arrested on 31 July 2020 in Harare, Zimbabwe ahead of anti-corruption protests. Later that year she was on the list of the BBC's 100 Women announced on 23 November 2020.

In September 2020, Dangarembga was announced as the University of East Anglia's inaugural International Chair of Creative Writing, from 2021 to 2022.

Dangarembga won the 2021 PEN International Award for Freedom of Expression, given annually since 2005 to honour writers who continue working despite being persecuted for their writing.

In June 2021, it was announced that Dangarembga would be the recipient of the prestigious 2021 Peace Prize awarded by the German book publishers and booksellers association, making her the first black woman to be honoured with the award since it was inaugurated in 1950.

In July 2021, she was elected to honorary Fellowship of Sidney Sussex College, Cambridge.

Dangarembga was chosen by English PEN as winner of the 2021 PEN Pinter Prize, awarded annually to a writer who, in the words spoken by Harold Pinter on receiving his Nobel Prize for Literature, casts an "unflinching, unswerving" gaze upon the world and shows a "fierce intellectual determination... to define the real truth of our lives and our societies".  In her acceptance speech at the British Library on 11 October 2021, Dangarembga named the Ugandan novelist Kakwenza Rukirabashaija as the International Writer of Courage Award.

In 2022, Dangarembga was selected to receive a Windham-Campbell Literature Prize for fiction.

In June 2022, an arrest warrant was issued at the Tsitsi Dangarembga center. She was prosecuted for incitement to public violence and violation of anti-Covid rules after an anti-government demonstration organized at the end of July 2020.

On September 29, 2022, Dangarembga was officially convicted of promoting public violence after her and her friend, Julie Barnes, walked around Harare in a peaceful protest while holding placards that read “We Want Better. Reform Our Institutions”. Dangarembga was given a $110 fine and a suspended six-month jail sentence. She announced that she planned to appeal her verdict amid human rights groups claiming that her prosecution was a direct result of President Emmerson  Mnangagwa’s attempts to “silence opposition in the long-troubled southern African country”.

Selected awards and honours 
 1989: Commonwealth Writers' Prize (Africa region) for Nervous Conditions
 2005: Kare Kare Zvako wis the Short Film Award and Golden Dhow at the Zanzibar International Film Festival, and the African Short Film Award at the Milan Film Festival
 2018:  Nervous Conditions named by the BBC as one of the top 100 books that have shaped the world
 2020: This Mournable Body shortlisted for the Booker Prize
 2021: PEN International Award for Freedom of Expression
 2021: 2021 Peace Prize from the German book publishers and booksellers association
 2021: Honorary Fellowship of Sidney Sussex College, Cambridge
 2021: PEN Pinter Prize from English PEN
 2022: Windham-Campbell Literature Prize (fiction)

List of works

Written works 

 The Third One (play)
 Lost of the Soil (play), 1983
 "The Letter" (short story), 1985, published in Whispering Land
 She No Longer Weeps (play), 1987
 Nervous Conditions, 1988, 
 The Book of Not, 2006, 
 This Mournable Body, 2018, 
 Black and Female (essays), 2022,

Filmography 

Neria (1993) (story writing)
The Great Beauty Conspiracy (1994)
Passport to Kill (1994)
Schwarzmarkt (1995) 
Everyone's Child (1996)
The Puppeteer (1996) 
Zimbabwe Birds, with Olaf Koschke (1988)
On the Border (2000)
Hard Earth – Land Rights in Zimbabwe (2001)
Ivory (2001) 
Elephant People (2002) 
Mother’s Day (2004)
High Hopes (2004) 
At the Water (2005)
Growing Stronger (2005) 
Kare Kare Zvako (2005) 
Peretera Maneta (2006) 
The Sharing Day (2008) 
I Want a Wedding Dress (2010) 
Ungochani (2010)
Nyami Nyami Amaji Abulozi (2011)

References

External links 

 A recording of Dangarembga's reading of her "Electing Zimbabwe"
 
 
 "Statement of support for Tsitsi Dangarembga", New Writing, University of East Anglis, October 2020.
 Leo Robson, "Why Tsitsi Dangarembga is one of the most remarkable authors the Booker Prize has ever celebrated", New Statesman, 13 November 2020.
 Mia Swart, "Tsitsi Dangarembga: Life in an 'ever-narrowing Zimbabwe'", AlJazeera, 16 November 2020.
 Catherine Taylor, "Tsitsi Dangarembga on her arrest, the Booker Prize and why she won't leave Zimbabwe: 'It's an ongoing trauma'", i, 16 November 2020.
 Troy Fielder, "UEA Live: An Emptiness That Hurts, In Conversation With Tsitsi Dangarembga", Concrete, 27 February 2021.

1959 births
Living people
20th-century novelists
20th-century Zimbabwean women writers
20th-century Zimbabwean writers
21st-century novelists
21st-century Zimbabwean women writers
21st-century Zimbabwean writers
Alumni of Arundel School
Alumni of the University of Cambridge
BBC 100 Women
Humboldt University of Berlin alumni
People from Mutoko
University of Zimbabwe alumni
Zimbabwean expatriates in England
Zimbabwean expatriates in Germany
Zimbabwean film directors
Zimbabwean novelists
Zimbabwean short story writers
Zimbabwean women film directors
Zimbabwean women short story writers
English-language writers from Zimbabwe